The Headbangers Ball is the fourth extended play by American electronic music duo Slander. Canadian independent electronic label Monstercat released the EP on November 29, 2018. The extended play was released with three singles, a North American tour and later gathered generally positive reviews.

Background and release
The initial concept of The Headbangers Ball came to be during Slander's residency in Las Vegas, thinking of it as a "mansion party set in the Great Gatsby era but with undead skeletons as our attendees." In an interview with Billboard Dance, the duo spoke about the concept and influences about the extended play, stating:

To promote the release of The Headbangers Ball, the extended play's three songs were released as singles. Its lead single, "You Don't Even Know Me" was released on September 20, 2018, "Running To You" on November 15, 2018, and "Hate Being Alone" on November 29, 2018. On November 29, 2018, the extended play was released exclusively as a digital download on international digital stores through Monstercat. Following the extended play's release, Slander began their The Headbangers Ball North American tour on January 11, 2019, at the Hollywood Palladium in Los Angeles.

Critical reception
The Headbangers Ball was well received by most critics. Writing for Billboard, Koury Angelo compared the extended play to the MTV show of the same name, writing that the "DJs are the rock stars, and Los Angeles-based duo SLANDER brings all those elements into a fresh and frenzied sound all its own". Writing for Dancing Astronaut, Chris Stack described the songs of the extended play as having a stark contrast with each other, writing that "each track places fluffy vocals and lush melodies at the helm of harder-hitting electronic elements, from dubstep and future bass." Noiseporn's Ria Qi described the three songs as each featuring unique elements, highlighting the "soothing melody and enthralling vocal in "You Don’t Even Know Me," the piercing, frenzied rhythm in "Running To You" and the heartfelt lyrics and heavy percussion in "Hate Being Alone.""

Track listing

Release history

References

2018 EPs
Monstercat EPs
Electronic EPs
Dubstep EPs
Electronic albums by American artists
Slander EPs